
Gmina Chodecz is an urban-rural gmina (administrative district) in Włocławek County, Kuyavian-Pomeranian Voivodeship, in north-central Poland.

Villages
Apart from the town of Chodecz, Gmina Chodecz contains the villages and settlements of Bogołomia, Bogołomia-Kolonia, Brzyszewo, Cetty, Chodeczek, Chodeczek-Wieś, Florkowizna, Gawin, Huta Chodecka, Huta Towarzystwo, Ignalin, Kołatki, Kromszewice, Kubłowo, Kubłowo Małe, Łakno, Łania, Łanięta, Lubieniec, Micielno, Mielinek, Mielno, Mstowo, Niesiołów, Niwki, Nowiny, Ogorzelewo, Pieleszki, Piotrowo, Podgórze, Prosno, Przysypka, Psary, Pyszkowo, Ruda Lubieniecka, Sadok, Sławęcin, Sobiczewy, Strzygi, Strzyżki, Szczecin, Trzeszczon, Uklejnica, Wola Adamowa, Zalesie, Zbijewo and Zieleniewo.

Neighbouring gminas
Gmina Chodecz is bordered by the gminas of Boniewo, Choceń, Dąbrowice, Lubień Kujawski and Przedecz.

References
Polish official population figures 2006

Chodecz
Włocławek County